Puyo Puyo!! 20th Anniversary is a puzzle game developed by Sonic Team and published by Sega. The game honored the twentieth year of the Puyo Puyo series, and was first released for the Nintendo DS in July 2011, and later for Wii, Nintendo 3DS, and PlayStation Portable in December 2011.

Gameplay 
In total, the game has 20 modes of gameplay, including 8 new modes, and 5 hidden modes from Puyo Puyo! 15th Anniversary. Except in Mission and Pair Puyo modes, a player is eliminated when he/she tops out, and the last player (or side) standing wins the round.

"Pair Puyo"
A two-on-two team play mode. The teammates share Nuisance Puyo and "lives" - when one of the teams' field tops out, the board is replaced with a new board with a pre-made chain and costs a life. When all lives are lost, the team is eliminated, and the last team standing wins the match.

You get bonuses for "Extra Chains" (firing a chain during your teammate's chain) and "Synchro Chains" (firing chains of the same length (3 or longer) at the same time).

Shop
Like Puyo Puyo Fever 2 there is a shop, but instead of ineffective game play items you can spend points you get from various modes for exchange of Puyo skins, alternate character voices, and alternate character costumes.

References

External links 
 Official website 

2011 video games
Nintendo DS games
Puyo Puyo
Puzzle video games
Sega arcade games
Sega video games
Sonic Team games
Nintendo Wi-Fi Connection games
Japan-exclusive video games
Wii games
Fictional trios
Fictional quartets
PlayStation Portable games
Nintendo 3DS games
Multiplayer and single-player video games
Video games developed in Japan